Gilberto Martínez Vidal (born October 1, 1979) is a Costa Rican former professional footballer who played as a defender.

Club career

Deportivo Saprissa
His performances in the domestic league and Nigeria's Football World Youth Championship soon earned him a place on the Costa Rica national football team. Martínez quickly established himself there as well, becoming one of the most wanted and loved from the fans. He started all three of the team's games in the 2002 FIFA World Cup, and his performances were well regarded.

Brescia Calcio
Due to his World Cup performances, Brescia purchased him from Deportivo Saprissa on September 15 of the same year. In his initial seasons with Brescia, Martínez established himself as a mainstay in the rondinelle defense line. However, an ankle injury he suffered during the 2006 FIFA World Cup limited him in the following seasons; he spent the whole 2006–07 season on loan to Roma, but failed to make an impact as he failed to recover from his injury. He returned to Brescia at the start of the 2007–08 season without having made a single appearance for the Rome-based club. He ultimately made his playing comeback in the 2008–09 season, confirming himself once again as a key player for his club, then in Serie B.

In February 2011 he was loaned to Sampdoria.

In January 2013, Martínez joined Lecce.

International career
He was part of Costa Rica's national team in the 1999 FIFA World Youth Championship held in Nigeria.

Nicknamed Tuma, Martínez made his debut for Costa Rica in a January 2001 FIFA World Cup qualification match against Guatemala and earned a total of 61 caps, scoring no goals. He represented his country in 26 FIFA World Cup qualification matches and played at both the 2002 and 2006 FIFA World Cups. He also played at the 2001 UNCAF Nations Cup as well as at the 2002 and 2003 CONCACAF Gold Cups.

He also played at the 2001 Copa América.

His final international was a March 2011 friendly match against Argentina.

Career statistics

2021 Former DT  Municipal Grecia | Costa Rica

References

External links
 
 

1979 births
Living people
People from Puntarenas Province
Association football defenders
Costa Rican footballers
Costa Rica international footballers
Costa Rica under-20 international footballers
Costa Rican expatriate sportspeople in Italy
2001 Copa América players
2002 CONCACAF Gold Cup players
2002 FIFA World Cup players
2003 CONCACAF Gold Cup players
2006 FIFA World Cup players
Deportivo Saprissa players
Brescia Calcio players
A.S. Roma players
U.C. Sampdoria players
U.S. Lecce players
Costa Rican expatriate footballers
Expatriate footballers in Italy
Liga FPD players
Serie A players
Serie B players